Arthur de Jesús Correa Toro (26 April 1941 – 26 May 2021) was a Colombian Roman Catholic bishop.

Biography

Correa Toro was born in Ituango, Colombia and was ordained to the priesthood in 1967. He served as bishop of the Roman Catholic Diocese of Ipiales, Colombia from 2000 until 2018.

Correa Toro died from complications of COVID-19 during the COVID-19 pandemic in Colombia on 26 May 2021, at age 80 in Pasto, Colombia.

References

1941 births
2021 deaths
Deaths from the COVID-19 pandemic in Colombia
20th-century Roman Catholic bishops in Colombia
21st-century Roman Catholic bishops in Colombia
People from Antioquia Department
Roman Catholic bishops of Ipiales